Valerian Zirakadze (born 19 April 1978) is a Georgian footballer who is currently a free agent.

References

1978 births
Living people
Footballers from Georgia (country)
Expatriate footballers from Georgia (country)
Expatriate footballers in Hungary
Expatriate footballers in Greece
Xanthi F.C. players
Kavala F.C. players
Association football midfielders